Tilia henryana Szyszyl., commonly known as Henry's lime, was introduced to the West from China by Ernest Wilson in 1901. The tree is native to the provinces of Anhui, Henan, Hubei, Hunan, Jiangsu, Jiangxi, Shaanxi, and Zhejiang, and was named for the Irish plantsman and sinologist Augustine Henry, who discovered it in 1888.

Description

Henry's lime is a deciduous tree growing to 25 m in height, its bark pale grey and fissured. The sea green leaves are cordate, < 10 cm long, with distinctive ciliate margins, and are borne on 3–5 cm petioles.  The tiny pale, almost white, fragrant flowers appear in clusters of up to 20 in autumn.

Cultivation
The original clone in commerce grew very slowly, but faster-growing clones are now available.  The tree performs best in sheltered locations.

Notable trees
The TROBI Champion grows at Birr Castle, Co. Offaly, Éire; planted in 1946 it measured 15 m tall by 44 cm d.b.h. in 2010.

Varieties
Two varieties are recognized, var. henryana and var. subglabra, principally distinguished by branchlets that are yellow, stellate tomentose, and glabrous, resp.

References

henryana
Trees of China